Coleophora laevipennis is a moth of the family Coleophoridae. It is found in Afghanistan.

The larvae feed on Cousinia congesta, Acroptilon repens and Inula grandis. They feed on the leaves of their host plant.

References

laevipennis
Moths described in 1967
Moths of Asia